The third season of  Alarm für Cobra 11 – Die Autobahnpolizei aired between October 14, 1997. and June 18, 1998.

Format
This season was first to be broadcast as full season

Cast
 Mark Keller - André Fux
 Erdoğan Atalay - Semir Gerkhan

Episodes

1997 German television seasons
1998 German television seasons